Janzen is a German and Dutch  surname (nowadays an English first name too), and may refer to:

 Chantal Janzen (born 1979), Dutch actress
 Daniel Janzen (born 1939), American ecologist
 Johannes Janzen (1896-1980s), First World War flying ace
 John M. Janzen (born 1937), American anthropologist
 Lee Janzen (born 1964), American golfer
 Marty Janzen (born 1973), American baseball player

See also
 Jantzen (disambiguation)
 Jansen (disambiguation)
 Janssen (disambiguation)

Patronymic surnames
Russian Mennonite surnames